Other People's Letters is a 1975 Soviet drama film directed by Ilya Averbakh.

Plot 
The film tells about a teacher of mathematics, who takes her student to her family, who as a result begins to feel like a mistress in her house.

Cast 
 Irina Kupchenko as Vera Ivanovna (as I. Kupchenko)
 Svetlana Smirnova as Zina Begunkova (as S. Smirnova)
 Sergei Kovalenkov as Igor (as S. Kovalenko)
 Zinaida Sharko as Angelina Grigoryevna (as Z. Sharko)
 Oleg Yankovskiy as Priachin (as O. Yankovskiy)
 Ivan Bortnik as Shura (as I. Bortnik)
 Natalya Skvortsova as Valya (as N. Skvortsova)
 Pyotr Arzhanov as Nikolay Artomovich
 Mayya Bulgakova
 Valentina Vladimirova

References

External links 
 

1975 films
1970s Russian-language films
Soviet drama films
1975 drama films